The 2005 Big Ten men's basketball tournament was the postseason men's basketball tournament for the Big Ten Conference and was played between March 9 and 12, 2005, at the United Center in Chicago, Illinois. This was the eighth annual Big Ten Men's Basketball Tournament. The championship was won by Illinois who defeated Wisconsin in the championship game. As a result, Illinois received the Big Ten's automatic bid to the NCAA tournament. The win marked the second tournament championship for Illinois in their fifth championship game appearance.

Seeds
All Big Ten schools played in the tournament. Teams were seeded by conference record, with a tiebreaker system used to seed teams with identical conference records. Seeding for the tournament was determined at the close of the regular conference season. The top five teams received a first round bye.

Bracket

All-Tournament Team
 James Augustine, Illinois – Big Ten tournament Most Outstanding Player
 Luther Head, Illinois
 Vincent Grier, Minnesota
 Zach Morley, Wisconsin
 Alando Tucker, Wisconsin

References

Big Ten men's basketball tournament
Tournament
Big Ten Conference men's basketball tournament
Big Ten men's basketball tournament
Basketball in Illinois